Paul Palmer (born 18 October 1974 in Lincoln, England) is a former international freestyle swimmer for England and Great Britain.

Swimming career
Coached by Ian Turner at the City of Lincoln Pentaqua Swimming Club, Palmer qualified for the 200 m, 400 m and 1500 m freestyle at the 1992 Barcelona Olympics, finishing a respectable 9th position (winning the "B" final) in the 200 m, and 10th position in the 400 m. After this success, in order to increase his chances of a medal at the following Atlanta games, Palmer relocated to Bath, along with Turner. Training in a 50 m pool, alongside other Olympic hopefuls at the performance centre allowed Palmer to further increase his swimming skills.

Palmer won the silver medal in the 400 m freestyle at the 1996 Summer Olympics in Atlanta, Georgia. A year later, at the 1997 European Aquatics Championships in Seville, he won gold in the 200 m freestyle.

He won the 2001 British Championship in the 100 metres freestyle, was six times winner of the 200 metres freestyle (1993, 1995, 1998–2001) and a six times winner of the 400 metres freestyle in (1992, 1993, 1998–2001).

See also
 List of Olympic medalists in swimming (men)

References

1974 births
Living people
English male freestyle swimmers
Olympic swimmers of Great Britain
Swimmers at the 1992 Summer Olympics
Swimmers at the 1996 Summer Olympics
Swimmers at the 2000 Summer Olympics
Sportspeople from Lincoln, England
Olympic silver medallists for Great Britain
World Aquatics Championships medalists in swimming
Medalists at the FINA World Swimming Championships (25 m)
European Aquatics Championships medalists in swimming
Medalists at the 1996 Summer Olympics
Olympic silver medalists in swimming
Team Bath swimmers